K. D. Prasenan is an Indian politician and a  member of the Kerala Legislative Assembly representing Alathur constituency.

Political career
KD Prasenan started his political life as a member of SFI. He was a leader of DYFI. He is former President Of Democratic Youth Federation of India (DYFI) Palakkad District and former Secretary of CPIM Alathur Area Committee.
He was elected to Kerala Legislative Assembly in 2016 and 2021 from Alathur constituency.

See also
 Kerala Legislature
 V. Chenthamarakshan
 K. D. Prasenan
 K. Krishnankutty
 A. K. Balan
 P. Unni
 P. K. Sasi
 K. V. Vijayadas
 Muhammed Muhsin
 P. K. Biju
 U. R. Pradeep

References 

People from Palakkad district
Communist Party of India (Marxist) politicians from Kerala
Kerala MLAs 2016–2021
Year of birth missing (living people)
Living people
Kerala politicians